Logan Circle may refer to:

Logan Circle (Washington, D.C.), a traffic circle and neighborhood in Washington, D.C.
Logan Circle (Philadelphia), a park in Philadelphia, Pennsylvania also known as Logan Square
 "Logan Circle", a song by The Wonder Years from The Upsides